The Featherstone National Wildlife Refuge is a National Wildlife Refuge located along the Potomac River in Virginia, at the point where it meets Neabsco Creek. The  of tidal marsh has been administered by the United States Fish and Wildlife Service since 1970; currently, it is part of the Potomac River National Wildlife Refuge Complex.  The refuge covers wetlands and woodlands, and has a railroad right-of-way bordering its western edge.  It is currently accessible only by boat, but has been considered as a possible portion of the route for the Potomac Heritage National Scenic Trail.

References

Featherstone National Wildlife Refuge Website

1970 establishments in Virginia
National Wildlife Refuges in Virginia
Protected areas of Prince William County, Virginia
Protected areas established in 1970
Wetlands of Virginia
Landforms of Prince William County, Virginia
Woodbridge, Virginia